Deuces Wild were a one-off band formed in Munich in 1991 by Stefan Zauner (Vocals, Keyboards) and Aron Strobel (Guitar), both of the successful German pop band Münchener Freiheit.  Their only album, Living in the Sun was released on Columbia Records in 1991 along with two singles: a Beatles cover, "This Boy", and the group-penned title track.  As the album used the writing partnership of Zauner, Strobel and Touchton, the album bore little difference to the music they had created under Münchener Freiheit. Neither album nor single were a success and, as of 2005, the album is out of print.  Zauner and Strobel disbanded Deuces Wild and concentrated their efforts on Münchener Freiheit's return to the Top 10, Liebe auf den ersten Blick.

Trivia
 On the track listing printed inside the booklet, the writers are credited as Steven Fencer (Zauner's name translated into English) and Nora LeBorts (an anagram of Aron Strobel).

German musical groups
Musicians from Munich